Ike & Tina Turner’s Kings of Rhythm Dance is an instrumental album by the Kings of Rhythm released on Sue Records in 1962.

Background 
Following Ike & Tina Turner's success after signing with Sue Records in 1960, the label released an album from the duo's band the Kings of Rhythm led by Ike Turner. Ike & Tina Turner appear on the cover, but Tina Turner does not sing on this album.

Most of the songs were penned by Ike Turner with the exception of the duo's Grammy nominated single "It's Gonna Work Out Fine."

Critical reception

Billboard (March 10, 1962): Here’s a rousing, exuberant package of danceable instrumentals (the Turner's don't sing here) with strong teen-appeal. The line-up, featuring standout guitar work, includes "The Gulley," "Potato Mash," "Steel Guitar Rag" and "Twistaroo."Cash Box (March 10, 1962): For their second Sue LP Ike and Tina Turner, who recently hit singles-wise with "Poor Fool" offer a variety of swinging items in a fast-moving dancing vein. Teamed up with their Kings of Rhythm, a real hot instrumental group, the two-some belt out with a down-to-earth sincerity on twelve terpsichorean excursions.AllMusic editor Richie Unterberger wrote:"Although the 14 tracks on this album are very typical early-'60s rock/R&B instrumentals in their tunes and arrangements, Ike Turner's guitar work is sparkling, lifting the LP out of the generic realm...Ike Turner really squeezes the last drop of invention out of these run-of-the-mill backdrops, though, relentlessly bending notes, wangling the whammy bar, and letting loose with some unpredictable runs and aggressive chording."

Track listing 
All compositions by Ike Turner except where noted.

Personnel 

Ike Turner – guitar
Kings of Rhythm

References

1962 albums
Ike Turner albums
Ike & Tina Turner albums
Albums produced by Ike Turner
Sue Records albums
Instrumental albums